Larus is a large genus of gulls with worldwide distribution (by far the greatest species diversity is in the Northern Hemisphere).

Many of its species are abundant and well-known birds in their ranges. Until about 2005–2007, most gulls were placed in this genus, but this arrangement is now known to be polyphyletic, leading to the resurrection of the genera Ichthyaetus, Chroicocephalus, Leucophaeus, and Hydrocoloeus (this last had been recognized more often than the other genera) for several species traditionally included in Larus.

They are in general medium to large birds, typically grey or white, often with black markings on their heads or wings. They have stout, longish bills and webbed feet.

The taxonomy of the large gulls in the herring and lesser black-backed complex is very complicated, with different authorities recognising between two and eight species.

Taxonomy
The genus Larus was introduced in 1758 by the Swedish naturalist Carl Linnaeus in the tenth edition of his Systema Naturae. The genus name is from Ancient Greek laros (λάῥος) or  Latin larus, which appears to have referred to a gull or other large seabird. The type species is the great black-backed gull (Larus marinus).

Species
The genus contains 24 species.

Fossils
Fossils of Larus gulls are known from the Middle Miocene, about 20-15 million years ago; allocation of earlier fossils to this genus is generally rejected. Biogeography of the fossil record suggests that the genus evolved in the northern Atlantic and spread globally during the Pliocene, when species diversity seems to have been highest, as with most seabirds.

Larus sp. (Middle Miocene of Grund, Austria)
Larus sp. (Middle Miocene of Romania) 
Larus sp. (Late? Miocene/Early Pliocene of Lee Creek Mine, U.S.) - several species 
Larus elmorei (Early/Middle Pliocene of Bone Valley, southeastern U.S.)
Larus lacus ( Late Pliocene of Pinecrest, southeastern U.S.)
Larus perpetuus (Late Pliocene of Pinecrest, southeastern U.S.)
Larus sp. (San Diego Late Pliocene of the southwestern U.S.)
Larus oregonus (Late Pliocene - Late Pleistocene of the west-central U.S.)
Larus robustus (Late Pliocene - Late Pleistocene of the west-central U.S.)
Larus sp. (Late Pleistocene of Lake Manix western U.S.)

"Larus" raemdonckii (Early Oligocene of Belgium) is now at least tentatively believed to belong in the procellariiform genus Puffinus. "L." elegans (Late Oligocene?/Early Miocene of St-Gérand-le-Puy, France) and "L." totanoides (Late Oligocene?/Early Miocene of southeastern France) are now in Laricola, while "L." dolnicensis (Early Miocene of the Czech Republic) was actually a pratincole; it is now placed in Mioglareola.

The Early Miocene "Larus" desnoyersii (southeastern France) and "L." pristinus (John Day Formation, Willow Creek, U.S.) probably do not belong in this genus; the former may be a skua.

Ring species

The circumpolar group of Larus gull species has often been cited as a classic example of the ring species. The range of these gulls forms a ring around the North Pole. The European herring gull, which lives primarily in Great Britain and Northern Europe, can hybridize with the American herring gull (living in North America), which can also interbreed with the Vega or East Siberian gull, the western subspecies of which, Birula's gull, can hybridize with Heuglin's gull which, in turn, can interbreed with the Siberian lesser black-backed gull (all four of these live across the north of Siberia). The last is the eastern representative of the lesser black-backed gulls back in northwestern Europe, including Great Britain. However, the lesser black-backed gulls and herring gull are sufficiently different that they rarely interbreed; thus, the group of gulls forms a continuum except in Europe, where the two lineages meet. However, a recent genetic study has shown that this example is far more complicated than presented here, and probably does not constitute a true ring species.

See also

 Hybridisation in gulls

References

 
Bird genera
Taxa named by Carl Linnaeus